John Palin may refer to:
 John Palin (politician) (1870–1934), British politician 
 John Palin (sport shooter) (born 1934), British former sports shooter